Thirsty Moon is a German Krautrock band. The band was founded in the early 1970s in Bremen and plays progressive rock with strong jazz influences. Band members were the brothers Jürgen and Norbert Drogies, Michael Kobs, Harald Konietzko, Erwin Noack, Willi Pape and Siegfried Pisalla, although this line-up changed in the late 1970s. The band's first two albums received critical acclaim and are considered Krautrock classics.

In 2007, Jürgen Drogies released the album Dreamcatcher and gave his new band the name Back to the Moon.

Band members
 Norbert Drogies - drums
 Michael Kobs - electric piano, organ
 Erwin Noack - congas, percussion
 Willi Pape - saxophone
 Harald Konietzko - bass, guitar, vocals, cello
 Jürgen Drogies - guitar, percussion
 Hans Werner Ranwig - organ, vocals
 Siegfried Pisalla - vocals, guitar
Later members:
 Rainer Neumann - saxophone
 Serge Weber - piano, synthesizer
 Junior Weerasinghe - drums, vocals

Discography
Thirsty Moon
 1972 Thirsty Moon (reissue 2006 LongHair LHC 52)
 1974 You'll Never Come Back (reissue 2006 LongHair LHC 53)
 1975 Blitz (reissue 2006 LongHair LHC 54)
 1976 A Real Good Time
 1981 Starchaser
 2006 I'll Be Back - Live '75 (first released 2006 LongHair LHC 55)
 2007 Dreamcatcher by Back to the Moon (SynGate 2111)
 2011 Lunar Eclipse - Live at Stagge's Hotel 1976

Back to the Moon
 2007 Dreamcatcher
 2010 Street view
 2010 Wave and smile (EP)
 2014 3

References

External links
Official homepage
SynGate

 

German progressive rock groups
Krautrock musical groups
Brain Records artists
Musical groups established in 1971
1971 establishments in Germany